Saarelainen is a Finnish surname. Notable people with the surname include:

Ilmari Saarelainen (born 1944), Finnish actor
Pekka Saarelainen (1868 – 1933), Finnish farmer and politician
Pekka Saarelainen (born 1967), Finnish curler
Sari Saarelainen (born 1981), Finnish racing cyclist
Timo Saarelainen (born 1960), retired Finnish basketball player

Finnish-language surnames